Kevin Gosztola (born March 10, 1988) is an American journalist and author known for work on whistleblowers cases, WikiLeaks, national security, and civil liberties. He is managing editor of Shadowproof, where he writes The Dissenter. Previously, The Dissenter was part of Firedoglake (FDL). Gosztola has covered the court-martial of Chelsea Manning the case of John Kiriakou, and the extradition of Julian Assange.

Gosztola has written for The Nation, Salon, and OpEdNews. He co-authored, with Greg Mitchell, Truth and Consequences: The US vs. Bradley Manning. Since 2014, Gosztola has co-hosted, with Rania Khalek, the podcast Unauthorized Disclosure. Gosztola has interviewed on Democracy Now!, The Real News, CounterSpin, Frontline, The Young Turks, and other shows and media outlets. He was one of few journalists to cover the Manning trial extensively, along with independent journalists Alexa O'Brien and Nathan Fuller, and a handful of reporters from The Guardian and the AP. He worked as an intern and videographer at The Nation before joining Firedoglake.

In December 2014, Firedoglake founder Jane Hamsher suspended operations indefinitely although parts of FDL, such as The Dissenter, continued. In August 2015, its tradition and legacy were assumed by Shadowproof, with Gosztola as Managing Editor.

Gosztola's book in defense of still-incarcerated Julian Assange, Guilty of Journalism: The Political Case Against Julian Assange, was released in March 2023.

Gosztola is from Mishawaka, Indiana and graduated from Columbia College Chicago with a degree in film in 2010. He lives with his wife in Chicago.

References

External links

 The Dissenter profile at Shadowproof
 Unauthorized Disclosures podcast at Shadowproof
 
 

1988 births
Living people
American bloggers
American online journalists
21st-century American journalists
Whistleblowing in the United States
Columbia College Chicago alumni
People from Mishawaka, Indiana